Jon T. Benn (30 July 1935 – 9 December 2018) was a businessman, entrepreneur, and actor, who most notably played the mob boss in Way of the Dragon. He was also an adventurer of sorts.

He wrote a book in reference to Bruce Lee, Remembering Bruce Lee, and subsequently opened a restaurant in Hong Kong, called "the Bruce Lee Cafe".

Background
A businessman rather than an actor, Jon T. Benn was the oldest out of five children born to Louis and Florence Benn. He was a tall man, standing at 6.4 who had a liking for fine food, fine drink, fine clothes and pretty women. From his part in Bruce Lee's Way of the Dragon, he had become something of a cult hero. The Hong Kong entrepreneur would get recognition, not only in his country of residence but abroad as well. In many films, Benn has appeared as the cigar smoking Caucasian villain.

Benn began a six-shop franchise, the "World's Wurst Sandwich and Sausage". His association with Hong Kong began after having sold 24 gift shops in the United States and wanting to see where he had been buying his goods from, Benn went to Hong Kong  in 1971.

Benn played the Mafia boss in Bruce Lee's film, Way of the Dragon which was released in 1973. His getting the part in the movie came about as a result of a cocktail party conversation with Hong Kong film producer Raymond Chow. At the time Benn didn't even know who Bruce Lee was. For his one week of work in the film, he was paid HK$2,000 (US$258). He became friends with Lee and Lee's family would come to his beach house on Lantau Island to go swimming.

Personal life
Benn was married at least two times in his life. His first wife was Nancy. They were married in a small church in Carmel, California, July 1959. They kept quiet about the wedding so they could have a larger one some time later with friends and family invited. One of the guests who attended was actress Jayne Mansfield. Benn's marriage with Nancy lasted until 1966. His second wife was Shannon an Asian woman who was thirty years his junior. According to Benn, she was the greatest love of his life.  They were married in 1995. Due to the fact that Benn didn't want children, they separated but remained good friends.

Travel and adventures
Having studied Spanish in Mexico as a teenager, Benn later ran an English language program there. This was before the nationalization of the media.

Film career

1960s to 1980s
During the 1960s, Benn had either bit parts or double roles in The Magnificent Seven in 1960, John Huston’s Night of the Iguana in 1964. These came about by chance and him happening to be in the right place at the right time.<ref>China.org.cn, (Shanghai Daily) March 19, 2009 - Always the wicked laowai - mafioso, magnate, spy</ref> Benn appeared as "The Boss" in Way of the Dragon, Bruce Lee's 1972 film which Lee both wrote and directed. It was his role in the film that he got the attention that he is most remembered for.ABS-CBN, Feb 21 2011 - Italian seeks kung-fu stardom in Shanghai By D'Arcy Doran, Agence France-Presse In 1980, the Joseph Kong directed Brucesploitation film, The Clones of Bruce Lee was released. Benn played the part of the mad scientist, Professor Lucas who is enlisted by the FBI to create clones of Bruce Lee.Kung Fu Cult Masters, By Leon Hunt - Page 79 Cloning the Dragon

1990s to 2000s
Benn appeared as a banker in John Derek’s 1990 film which starred Bo Derek, Ghosts Can't Do It.Blu-ray.com - Actor, Jon T. Benn

In November 1997, Benn was guest of honor at the Brandon Lee Association sponsored convention in England which commemorated the 25th anniversary of Way of the Dragon. Pictures of Benn with Lee and Norris which were taken during the filming of Way of the Dragon appeared in a magazine which covered the silver anniversary event. It appeared that Benn had a popular than ever status as a cult celebrity. Benn was once offered $50 by a Japanese fan for his half smoked cigar.  Around that time in the late 90s he was running his Bruce Lee café and sharing his experiences with Lee to patrons.

In 2006, the Ronny Yu directed Fearless which starred Jet Li was released. Benn played the part of the American businessman.ComingSoon.net, September 20, 2006 - Jet Li’s Fearless By  Joshua Starnes
Benn played a villain in Jakob Montrasio's The Way of the Spur which was released in 2012. Montrasio was thrilled when it was confirmed that Benn would be in the film. Also that year, The Man with the Iron Fists was released. The RZA directed film which starred Russell Crowe, Cung Le, Lucy Liu also featured Pam Grier. Benn played a plantation owner.

Benn's last film role was as the Big Boss in the Scott McQuaid directed sci-fi B film Space Ninjas that was released in 2019. The film starred Dirk Benedict.The Echo, 14th November 2018 - News, Southend-born filmmaker to screen debut Malaysian film at town's horror festival By Ellis Whitehouse His last film was a documentary short, The Big Boss Remembered. Actor and filmmaker Michael Worth spent several days with Benn and his family in Kentucky for documentary on Bruceploitation. This short film came about as a result of Worth putting it together with an interview that Benn insisted on and Benn's brother Rick organizing the shoot.  Benn who had been diagnosed with blood cancer and wasn't sure how long he had left to live and said that Worth should come out to see him as soon as possible. Benn and Worth had actually met 20 years prior to this. He died several weeks later.

Filmography

Literature
 Remembering Bruce Lee: And Jon Benn's Other Adventures by Jon T. Benn - Blacksmith Books - 
 Impact August 1998 (Interviews with Benny Urquidez pt.2, Jon Benn etc.)
 Bruce Lee Review'' No. 6 (Special Appearance by Jon Benn)

References

External links

Jon Benn Q&A
Interview in Smartshanghai 05.2013
 Kenton Public Library - Images of Jon Toby Benn

Hong Kong male film actors
1935 births
2018 deaths
American restaurateurs
Hong Kong businesspeople
American radio hosts